Cishan may mean:

 Cishan culture, a Neolithic culture in southern Hebei, People's Republic of China
 Cishan, Wu'an (磁山镇), town in Wu'an, Hebei, People's Republic of China
 Cishan, Kaohsiung (旗山區), a township in Kaohsiung, Republic of China (Taiwan)
 Cishan River (旗山溪), tributary of the Kaoping River in Taiwan